Senga District is a district of Northern Province, Zambia. It was separated from Mbala District in 2016.

References 

Districts of Northern Province, Zambia